The Nelthorpe baronetcy, of Grays Inn in the City of London, was a title in the baronetage of England.  It was created on 10 May 1666 for John Nelthorpe. The fifth baronet was High Sheriff of Lincolnshire in 1741, the sixth baronet High Sheriff in 1767, the seventh baronet in 1800 and the eighth baronet in 1842. The title became extinct on the death of the last in 1865.

The family seat was Scawby Hall, Scawby, Lincolnshire.

Nelthorpe baronets, of Grays Inn (1666)

 Sir John Nelthorpe, 1st Baronet (1614–1669)
Sir Goddard Nelthorpe, 2nd Baronet (–1704)Nephew of the 1st Baronet
Sir Montagu Nelthorpe, 3rd Baronet (1661–1722)
Sir Henry Nelthorpe, 4th Baronet (–1729)
Sir Henry Nelthorpe, 5th Baronet (1697–1746) (brother of the 3rd Baronet)
Sir John Nelthorpe, 6th Baronet (1746–1799)
Sir Henry Nelthorpe, 7th Baronet (1773–1830)
Sir John Nelthorpe, 8th Baronet (1814–1865)

References

External links

Painting of Sir John Nelthorpe, 6th Baronet, out shooting with his dogs in Barton Field, Lincolnshire, 1776.
The Nelthorpes of Scawby Hall

Extinct baronetcies in the Baronetage of England